Eudasyphora is a large genus from the fly family Muscidae.

Species list
E. canadiana Cuny, 1980
E. cordilleriana Cuny, 1980
E. cyanella (Meigen, 1826)
E. cyanicolor (Zetterstedt, 1845)
E. kempi Aubertin & Emden, 1965
E. occidentalis  (Peris & Llorente, 1963)
E. zimini (Hennig, 1963)

References

Muscidae
Muscoidea genera
Muscomorph flies of Europe
Taxa named by Charles Henry Tyler Townsend